Lhota pod Radčem is a municipality and village in Rokycany District in the Plzeň Region of the Czech Republic. It has about 300 inhabitants. The folk architecture in the centre of the village is well preserved and is protected by law as a village monument zone.

References

Villages in Rokycany District